Aponogeton madagascariensis is commonly known as Madagascar laceleaf, lattice leaf or lace plant. It is an aquatic plant native to Madagascar, popularly sold for use in aquariums. It is endangered in the wild.

Description
It is an aquatic monocotyledonous perennial plant with tuberous rhizomes  in diameter. The leaves spread horizontally beneath the surface of the water, and are little more than a lattice-like skeletal network of veins with no tissue between. There seem to be several forms of this plant in cultivation, some large, some much smaller.

Cultivation and uses
The tuberous roots are edible. It requires water temperatures of 15-26 °C and pH of 5-7.5, growing best in low light outdoors. The substrate should be rich in nutrients.

It is a speciality in botanical gardens all over the world. It was once in such high demand that it came close to extinction in its natural habitat in Madagascar.

A. madagascariensis is often regarded as a difficult plant to cultivate.  This is due to several factors: 1) it needs bright indoor light to thrive; this encourages the growth of algae on the lattice-like leaves; which is difficult to remove; 2) newly imported bulbs grow well in their first year, but often fail in their second year, apparently due to a lack of food storage in the bulbs (cause still unknown); 3) seeds may be produced, but often fail to germinate or thrive. Some enthusiasts recommend strong water movement and a high filtration rate for this plant.

References

External links

 Madagascar Lace Plant
 Tropica
 'Age of Aquariums - reader's experiences''
 Success with Aponogeton Fenestralis
 image in the wild
  flowering in the wild

madagascariensis
Aquatic plants
Endemic flora of Madagascar
Freshwater plants